Matigara Railway Station  is one of the railway stations that serve Siliguri in Darjeeling district in the Indian state of West Bengal. This is a small station consisting of three platforms, among them one  broad gauge platforms and one metre gauge platform.

Trains 

The train operation in this station is now closed for upgradation. But in the past time some local trains are stopped here. Few years ago Train Bus is running from Siliguri to Naxalbari is halt here but now due to less passenger, this Train Bus service also closed. Now Indian railway department is monitoring to develop the station and after that again start local tarin service from this station.

References

 Railway stations in Siliguri
Railway stations in Darjeeling district
Transport in Siliguri